A statutory tenancy is a type of tenancy in the United Kingdom under s2(1)(a) of the Rent Act 1977.

References

English property law
Tenancies in the United Kingdom